SKD may refer to:

IATA airport code for Samarkand Airport, Uzbekistan
Semi-knocked-down kit of parts
Science Ki Duniya, a magazine
Slovenski krščanski demokrati (Slovene Christian Democrats), Slovene political party
Shaun Kenny-Dowall, rugby league footballer